Augustin Maillefer (born 29 April 1993) is a Swiss rower. He competed in the men's quadruple sculls event at the 2016 Summer Olympics.

References

External links
 

1993 births
Living people
Swiss male rowers
Olympic rowers of Switzerland
Rowers at the 2012 Summer Olympics
Rowers at the 2016 Summer Olympics
Place of birth missing (living people)
Rowers at the 2010 Summer Youth Olympics